The Radford Highlanders Men's Soccer team is an intercollegiate varsity sports team of Radford University, located in Radford, Virginia. The team is a member of the Big South Conference of the National Collegiate Athletic Association.  The team was founded in 1975 as the result of the combined efforts of student-activist G. Thomas Lillard, University President Donald Dedmon, and Athletic Director Charles (Chuck) Taylor.

Roster 
As of January 15, 2023

Team management 

Coaching Staff

References

External links 
 

 
1975 establishments in Virginia
Association football clubs established in 1975